Carol Jenkins may refer to:

Carol Heiss (born 1940), American figure skater and actress
Carol Jenkins Barnett (born 1956), American philanthropist and businesswoman
Carol Marie Davis Jenkins (1947–1968), African American woman murdered in Indiana
Carol Mayo Jenkins (born 1938), American actress
Carol Jenkins (activist), American journalist and activist
Carol Jenkins (poet), Australian poet